The 1967–68 South-West Indian Ocean cyclone season was an above average cyclone season.

Systems

Moderate Tropical Storm Anita

Tropical Cyclone Belinda

Tropical Cyclone Carmen

The storm also dropped rainfall on Réunion.

Tropical Depression Debby

Tropical Cyclone Elspeth

Severe Tropical Storm Flossie

Intense Tropical Cyclone Georgette

Cyclone Georgette was the longest-lasting tropical cyclone in the South-West Indian Ocean basin since the advent of satellite imagery. It formed on January 10, 1968, well to the northeast of the Mascarene Islands. Tracking generally westward, Georgette struck northern Madagascar on January 15 as a tropical storm. It moved southwestward in the Mozambique Channel, crossing over eastern Mozambique on January 19. It quickly reached open waters while gradually intensifying, executing a loop off of eastern Mozambique. Georgette continued to the southeast, passing over southern Madagascar on January 28. It was last noted on February 2 after lasting for 24 days.

Georgette killed one person in the Comoros, eight in Mozambique, and 23 in Madagascar. The storm brought heavy, but beneficial rainfall to Réunion.

Tropical Cyclone Henriette

On January 21, Cyclone Henriette passed just east of Rodrigues, producing  wind gusts.

Severe Tropical Storm Ida

Ida affected Réunion and Mauritius.

Intense Tropical Cyclone Gina–Janine

Moderate Tropical Storm Karine

The storm passed near Réunion, bringing heavy rainfall that caused river flooding. Six people drowned on the island during the storm's passage.

Moderate Tropical Storm Lottie

Tropical Cyclone Monique

The winds wrecked most of the island's crops and destroyed many houses while also causing severe erosion. The outskirts of Monique also produced high waves and dropped rainfall in Réunion.

Tropical Cyclone Noreen

See also

 Atlantic hurricane seasons: 1967, 1968
 Eastern Pacific hurricane seasons: 1967, 1968
 Western Pacific typhoon seasons: 1967, 1968
 North Indian Ocean cyclone seasons: 1967, 1968

References

South-West Indian Ocean cyclone seasons